Hannah Harriet Hayes is a fictional character on the US television series Studio 60 on the Sunset Strip, played by Sarah Paulson. The character is loosely based on actress Kristin Chenoweth (who had dated Studio 60 creator Aaron Sorkin and starred in Sorkin's previous series, The West Wing, after Sorkin had left it); there is an opinion that she is also at least partially based on former Saturday Night Live comedian Victoria Jackson.

Personal history

Hayes describes much of her personal history to Vanity Fair journalist Martha O'Dell in "The Long Lead Story". Hayes was born in Brighton, Michigan to a father who worked in a paper processing plant and a mother who was a secretary in a doctor's office. She has six brothers, all older and none of them religious. It was her mother, a devout Baptist, who introduced Harriet —who uses her middle name because a Hannah Hayes was already on the rolls of the Screen Actors Guild — to Christianity, taking her to church every Sunday. By the age of six, Harriet was able to quote entire passages of scripture.

Hayes claims to have become a comedian and a Christian at more or less the same time, at the age of 11: "My mother put me in church plays and one time I just went up on a line and to cover I went into a Judy Holliday impression. There was stunned silence until the minister burst out laughing, and I looked and I saw the pride on my mother's face, and I told her I was ready to accept Christ and I was baptized."

Hayes got her Bachelor's degree in music at Rutgers University on an academic scholarship and was offered a scholarship for a Master's degree in music at Kansas State University, but turned it down in order to pursue a career in comedy. She started at The Second City in Chicago, where she swept up after shows, and later moved to L.A. where she interned with the Groundlings. It was there that she was discovered by Danny Tripp, who got her an audition for Studio 60.

Hayes states that, as a Christian, she has no problem with premarital sex - indeed, she has no problem having premarital sex. According to ""Nevada Day Part I", she was asked for her opinion on gay marriage; she responded that the Bible stated that homosexuality was a sin, but that it also said "judge not, lest ye be judged", concluding that "it's for smarter people than me to decide". The reporters only printed the first part of the statement, which caused a media circus, and agitated both gay rights activists and social conservatives.

In the series pilot, Hayes has recently ended a romantic relationship with Matt Albie after they quarreled over her appearance on The 700 Club to promote her new album of spiritual music. Romantic tension between her and Matt is a principal story arc of the series. She also has a brief romance with film director Luke Scott, who offers the part of Anita Pallenberg in a film about the early history of The Rolling Stones, with the understanding that the schedule would be compatible with her primary TV job. This was not the first romantic relationship between Harriet and Luke, as flashbacks reveal that they were dating at the time of Matt's departure from Studio 60, back when Luke was a staff writer for the show.

See also
 List of Studio 60 on the Sunset Strip characters

References

Fictional characters from Michigan
Fictional actors
Television characters introduced in 2006